Phyllis Goad was a female athlete who competed for England.

Athletics career
She competed for England in the 80 metres hurdles at the 1934 British Empire Games in London.

References

English female hurdlers
Athletes (track and field) at the 1934 British Empire Games
Commonwealth Games competitors for England